The 2022–23 Canisius Golden Griffins men's ice hockey season was the 43rd season of play for the program, the 25th at the Division I level, and the 20th in the Atlantic Hockey conference. The Golden Griffins represented Canisius College and were coached by Trevor Large, in his 6th season.

Season
Due to the closure of the Buffalo airport, caused by heavy snowfall, the series with Air Force on December 30-31 was postponed. It was later rescheduled for February 13 and 14 and, as a result, the series with Sacred Heart was pushed back a day to February 18-19.

Departures

Recruiting

Roster
As of 1 August 2022.

Standings

Schedule and results

|-
!colspan=12 style=";" | Regular Season

|-
!colspan=12 style=";" | 

|-
!colspan=12 style=";" |

Scoring statistics

Goaltending statistics

Rankings

References

2022–23
2022–23 Atlantic Hockey men's ice hockey season
2022–23 NCAA Division I men's ice hockey by team
2023 in sports in New York (state)
2022 in sports in New York (state)